Acmeshachia gigantea is a moth of the family Notodontidae first described by Henry John Elwes in 1890. It is found in Pakistan, north-western India, Nepal, north-eastern India, Myanmar, northern Thailand, south-western China, Taiwan and northern Vietnam.

References

Moths described in 1890
Notodontidae
Moths of Asia